Cubotinea is a genus of moths belonging to the family Tineidae. It contains only one species, Cubotinea orghidani, which is found on Cuba.

References

Tineidae
Monotypic moth genera
Moths of the Caribbean
Endemic fauna of Cuba
Tineidae genera